Oliver James Bailey (born 25 April 1982) is an English cricketer. Bailey is a right-handed batsman who bowls right-arm medium-fast. He was born in Plymouth, Devon.

Bailey represented the Somerset Cricket Board in a single List A match against Norfolk in the 2nd round of the 2002 Cheltenham & Gloucester Trophy, which was held in 2001 at Manor Park, Horsford. In his only List A match, he wasn't required to bat or bowl, but he did take a single catch in the field.

References

External links
Oliver Bailey at Cricinfo
Oliver Bailey at CricketArchive

1982 births
Living people
Cricketers from Plymouth, Devon
English cricketers
Somerset Cricket Board cricketers